The Gandolfo Theater is a historic building in Yuma, Arizona. It was built by John Gandolfo in 1917. It showed plays and movies, and it was also a meeting place for Elks and Freemasons until the third floor burned down in 1927. The theater closed down in 1950. It has been listed on the National Register of Historic Places since December 7, 1982.

References

External links

 
National Register of Historic Places in Yuma County, Arizona
Early Commercial architecture in the United States
Buildings and structures completed in 1917